The George Sarton Medal is the most prestigious award given by the History of Science Society. It has been awarded annually since 1955. It is awarded to an historian of science from the international community who became distinguished for "a lifetime of scholarly achievement" in the field.

The medal was designed by Bern Dibner and is named after George Sarton, the founder of the journal Isis and one of the founders of modern history of science.

The Sarton Medalists are:

1955 – George Sarton
1956 – Charles Singer and Dorothea Waley Singer
1957 – Lynn Thorndike
1958 – John Farquhar Fulton
1959 – Richard Shryock
1960 – Owsei Temkin 
1961 – Alexandre Koyré 
1962 – E. J. Dijksterhuis 
1963 – Vassili Zoubov
1964 – not awarded 
1965 – J. R. Partington 
1966 – Anneliese Maier 
1967 – not awarded 
1968 – Joseph Needham 
1969 – Kurt Vogel 
1970 – Walter Pagel
1971 – Willy Hartner
1972 – Kiyosi Yabuuti
1973 – Henry Guerlac
1974 – I. Bernard Cohen 
1975 – René Taton
1976 – Bern Dibner 
1977 – Derek T. Whiteside
1978 – Adolph Pavlovich Yushkevich
1979 – Maria Luisa Righini-Bonelli
1980 – Marshall Clagett
1981 – A. Rupert Hall and Marie Boas Hall
1982 – Thomas S. Kuhn 
1983 – Georges Canguilhem 
1984 – Charles Coulston Gillispie
1985 – Co-winners: Paolo Rossi (philosopher and historian of science) and Richard S. Westfall
1986 – Ernst Mayr 
1987 – G.E.R. Lloyd
1988 – Stillman Drake 
1989 – Gerald Holton 
1990 – A. Hunter Dupree
1991 – Mirko D. Grmek
1992 – Edward Grant and George A. van Sande 
1993 – John L. Heilbron 
1994 – Allen G. Debus 
1995 – Charles E. Rosenberg
1996 – Loren Graham
1997 – Betty Jo Teeter Dobbs
1998 – Thomas L. Hankins 
1999 – David C. Lindberg
2000 – Frederic L. Holmes
2001 – Daniel J. Kevles
2002 – John Colton Greene
2003 – Nancy Siraisi
2004 – Robert E. Kohler
2005 – A. I. Sabra
2006 – Mary Jo Nye
2007 – Martin J. S. Rudwick
2008 – Ronald L. Numbers
2009 – John E. Murdoch
2010 – Michael McVaugh
2011 – Robert J. Richards
2012 – Lorraine Daston
2013 – Simon Schaffer
2014 – Steven Shapin
2015 – Robert Fox
2016 – Katharine Park
2017 – Garland E. Allen
2018 – Sally Gregory Kohlstedt
2019 – M. Norton Wise
2020 – Jim Bennett
2021 – Bernadette Bensaude-Vincent
2022 – Margaret W. Rossiter

See also

 List of history awards
 List of general science and technology awards

References

External links
 History of Science Society, The Sarton Medalists 
 

History of science awards
American science and technology awards
Awards established in 1955
1955 establishments in the United States